The 4th constituency of Calvados is a French legislative constituency in the Calvados département. Like the other 576 French constituencies, it elects one MP using the two-round system, with a run-off if no candidate receives over 50% of the vote in the first round.

Historic representation

Election results

2022

 
 
 
 
 
 
 
|-
| colspan="8" bgcolor="#E9E9E9"|
|-

2017

2012

|- style="background-color:#E9E9E9;text-align:center;"
! colspan="2" rowspan="2" style="text-align:left;" | Candidate
! rowspan="2" colspan="2" style="text-align:left;" | Party
! colspan="2" | 1st round
! colspan="2" | 2nd round
|- style="background-color:#E9E9E9;text-align:center;"
! width="75" | Votes
! width="30" | %
! width="75" | Votes
! width="30" | %
|-
| style="background-color:" |
| style="text-align:left;" | Nicole Ameline
| style="text-align:left;" | Union for a Popular Movement
| UMP
| 
| 41.04%
| 
| 52.89%
|-
| style="background-color:" |
| style="text-align:left;" | Clémentine Le Marrec
| style="text-align:left;" | Socialist Party
| PS
| 
| 30.64%
| 
| 47.11%
|-
| style="background-color:" |
| style="text-align:left;" | Gilles Lebreton
| style="text-align:left;" | Front National
| FN
| 
| 12.60%
| colspan="2" style="text-align:left;" |
|-
| style="background-color:" |
| style="text-align:left;" | Pierre Mouraret
| style="text-align:left;" | Left Front
| FG
| 
| 8.77%
| colspan="2" style="text-align:left;" |
|-
| style="background-color:" |
| style="text-align:left;" | Pascal Chapelle
| style="text-align:left;" | Europe Ecology – The Greens
| EELV
| 
| 3.19%
| colspan="2" style="text-align:left;" |
|-
| style="background-color:" |
| style="text-align:left;" | Pierre-Claude Le Joncour
| style="text-align:left;" | Miscellaneous Right
| DVD
| 
| 1.54%
| colspan="2" style="text-align:left;" |
|-
| style="background-color:" |
| style="text-align:left;" | Arlette Girond
| style="text-align:left;" | Miscellaneous Right
| DVD
| 
| 1.20%
| colspan="2" style="text-align:left;" |
|-
| style="background-color:" |
| style="text-align:left;" | Caroline Derec
| style="text-align:left;" | Far Left
| EXG
| 
| 0.59%
| colspan="2" style="text-align:left;" |
|-
| style="background-color:" |
| style="text-align:left;" | Sophie Liard
| style="text-align:left;" | Far Left
| EXG
| 
| 0.42%
| colspan="2" style="text-align:left;" |
|-
| colspan="8" style="background-color:#E9E9E9;"|
|- style="font-weight:bold"
| colspan="4" style="text-align:left;" | Total
| 
| 100%
| 
| 100%
|-
| colspan="8" style="background-color:#E9E9E9;"|
|-
| colspan="4" style="text-align:left;" | Registered voters
| 
| style="background-color:#E9E9E9;"|
| 
| style="background-color:#E9E9E9;"|
|-
| colspan="4" style="text-align:left;" | Blank/Void ballots
| 
| 1.40%
| 
| 2.41%
|-
| colspan="4" style="text-align:left;" | Turnout
| 
| 58.65%
| 
| 57.62%
|-
| colspan="4" style="text-align:left;" | Abstentions
| 
| 41.35%
| 
| 42.38%
|-
| colspan="8" style="background-color:#E9E9E9;"|
|- style="font-weight:bold"
| colspan="6" style="text-align:left;" | Result
| colspan="2" style="background-color:" | UMP HOLD
|}

2007

2002

 
 
 
 
 
 
|-
| colspan="8" bgcolor="#E9E9E9"|
|-

1997

References

Sources
 Official results of French elections from 1998: 

4